Moasseseh-ye Hajj Ahmad (also Romanized as Moasseseh-ye Ḩājj Aḩmad) is a village in Mollasani Rural District, in the Central District of Bavi County, Khuzestan Province, Iran. At the 2006 census, its population was 19, in 5 families.

References 

Populated places in Bavi County